Juban District  is a district of the Dhale Governorate, Yemen. As of 2015, the district had a population of 73,960 inhabitants.

Sub-Districts
There are at least 78 sub-district entities located within the Juban District, Yemen.

References

Districts of Dhale Governorate